Kozel is a hunting castle in Šťáhlavy near Plzeň in the Czech Republic from the 18th century.

History
The castle was built in the Neoclassical style in 1784–1879. It was designed by architect Václav Haberditz for Jan Vojtěch of Czernin. It is a ground-floor building around an inner rectangular court. In the 1990s, the castle was expanded by another four buildings – the Chapel of the Holy Cross, the riding hall, servants' quarters and the stables. The castle complex includes a large park from the 19th century.

References

External links

Castles in the Czech Republic
Castles in the Plzeň Region
Tourist attractions in the Plzeň Region
National Cultural Monuments of the Czech Republic
Plzeň-City District
Palace theatres